Q'umirqucha or Q'umir Qucha (Quechua q'umir green, qucha lake, "green lake", hispanicized spelling Jomercocha) is a lake in Peru located in the Cusco Region, Quispicanchi Province, Marcapata District. Q'umirqucha lies between the mountains Paqu Ananta and Ch'akiriyuq of the Willkanuta mountain range, north of the village Yanaq Qusqu K'uchu.

References 

Lakes of Peru
Lakes of Cusco Region